Barmston may refer to:

Barmston, East Riding of Yorkshire, England
Barmston, Tyne and Wear, England on List of places in Tyne and Wear